The 1967 Amstel Gold Race was the second edition of the annual road bicycle race "Amstel Gold Race", held on Sunday April 15, 1967, in the Dutch provinces of North Brabant and Limburg. The race stretched 213 kilometres, with the start in Helmond and the finish in Meerssen. There were a total of 137 competitors, and 49 cyclists finished the race.

Result

External links
Results

Amstel Gold Race
1967 in road cycling
1967 in Dutch sport